The 2006 Giro d'Italia was the 89th edition of the Giro d'Italia, one of cycling's Grand Tours. The Giro began in Seraing, Belgium with an individual time trial on 6 May, and Stage 12 occurred on 19 May with an undulating stage from Livorno. The race finished in Milan on 28 May.

Stage 12
19 May 2006 - Livorno to Sestri Levante,

Stage 13
20 May 2006 - Alessandria to La Thuile,

Stage 14
21 May 2006 - Aosta to Domodossola,

Stage 15
22 May 2006 - Mergozzo to Brescia,

Stage 16
23 May 2006 - Rovato to Trento,

Stage 17
24 May 2006 - Tramin to Plan de Corones,

Stage 18
25 May 2006 - Sillian to Gemona del Friuli,

Stage 19
26 May 2006 - Pordenone to San Pellegrino Pass,

Stage 20
27 May 2006 - Trento to Aprica,

Stage 21
28 May 2006 - Museo del Ghisallo to Milan,

References

2006 Giro d'Italia
Giro d'Italia stages